The German Socio-Economic Panel (SOEP [], for  Sozio-oekonomisches Panel) is a longitudinal panel dataset of the population in  Germany.  It is a household based study which started in 1984 and which reinterviews adult household members annually. Additional samples have been taken from time to time. In 2015, there will be about 14,000 households, and more than 30,000 adult persons sampled. Some of the many topics surveyed include household composition, occupation, employment, earnings, health and life satisfaction. The annual surveys are conducted by the German Institute for Economic Research (DIW Berlin) and the Kantar Group. The survey is funded by the German Federal Government and the State of Berlin via the «Bund-Länder-Kommission» (State/Federal State Commission) for Educational Planning and Research Promotion.

Data are available to social science researchers in Germany and abroad in SPSS/PSPP, SAS/DAP, Stata, R/S-PLUS and ASCII format. Extensive documentation in English and German is available online. 

SOEP data are integrated into the Cross National Equivalent File (CNEF) which contains panel data from Australia, Canada, Germany, Great Britain and the United States. The data distribution of the SOEP for researchers outside of Germany is supplied with the CNEF by a group at Ohio State University. Application to use this international distribution has to be made to the DIW Berlin.

Subsamples

See also
Canadian Survey of Labour and Income Dynamics (SLID) 
Cross-National Equivalent File (CNEF)
Household, Income and Labour Dynamics in Australia Survey (HILDA,
Panel Study of Income Dynamics (PSID)
Swiss Household Panel (SHP) (URL:last access 2013-05-28)
LISS panel (LISS)
 Survey on Household Income and Wealth (SHIW)
UK households: a longitudinal study (UKHLS) / Understanding Society, UK
 formerly British Household Panel Survey (BHPS), UK

Notes

External links
SOEP (official) website (URL accessed 2013-05-28)
Cross National Equivalent File (CNEF) (URL accessed 2016-01-28)
Swiss Household Panel (URL accessed 2013-05-28)
LISS panel (URL accessed 2013-05-28)

Economy of Germany
Economic data
Panel data
Cohort studies
Leibniz Association
Household surveys